East Queen's was a federal electoral district in Prince Edward Island, Canada, that was represented in the House of Commons of Canada from 1896 to 1904.

This riding was created in 1892 from parts of King's County and Queen's County ridings.

It was abolished in 1903 when it was redistributed into King's and  Queen's ridings.

It consisted of the eastern part of Queen's County and parts of King's County.

Election results

By-election: On election being declared void, 11 February 1901

See also 

 List of Canadian federal electoral districts
 Past Canadian electoral districts

External links 
Riding history for East Queen's (1892–1903) from the Library of Parliament

Former federal electoral districts of Prince Edward Island